Adolphe Schloss (10 August 1842 – 31 December 1910) was a German-French art collector.

Life 
Schloss was born to a Jewish family in Furth, Lower Bavaria. He married Mathilde Lucie Haas and together they collected works of art from the Northern and Southern Netherlands that became notable in the 1900s as the Ad. Schloss collection. They held a gallery at Salon Adolphe Schloss, residence 38, avenue Henri Martin, Paris. After Adolphe's death there, his widow continued to collect paintings and lent her works to various exhibitions as Mme. A. Schloss or Frau Adolphe Schloß in Paris.

Nazi art looting
Frau Schloss died in 1938 and the collection was left to their children Marguerite, Henry, Juliette and Lucien. By that time it was clear the respected collection had been targeted by the Nazis and the heirs moved what they could to Château de Chambon, Laguenne for safekeeping during the war, where it was looted by the Vichy government in 1943. Of the 333 objects seized there, only 230 were actually offered to Hitler's Führer museum and 49 were saved for France and given to the Louvre. After the war all were lost, but gradually 148 objects could be rediscovered. In 2016 a painting, Portrait of a Man by Van der Helst, looted from the Schloss collection in 1943 was to be auctioned at the Im Kinsky auction house in Vienna. The lot was pulled at the request of the French government.

References

Links
French government website
English summary about the collection
 Soixante-dix tableaux de la collection de feu M. Adolphe Schloss : [mis en vente] à Paris, by Adolphe Schloss, Galerie Charpentier, 25 mai 1949.

1842 births
1910 deaths
People from Landshut (district)
Art collectors from Paris
French people of German-Jewish descent
French art collectors
Jewish art collectors
19th-century art collectors
20th-century art collectors
German emigrants to France